Evacanthinae is a subfamily in the family Cicadellidae (leafhoppers).

Distribution
Members of Evacanthinae are found worldwide and are on every continent except for Antarctica.

Tribes and genera
There are five tribes in the subfamily, some of which were subfamilies of their own.

Balbillini
Erected by Baker in 1923. They are found in the Afrotropical and  Indomalayan realms. Their colour is mostly dull, being yellowish to greyish in appearance.
 Balbillus Distant, 1908
 Stenotortor  Baker, 1923

Evacanthini
Erected by Metcalf in 1939. They are distributed across most of the Northern Hemisphere and into the Indomalayan realm.

  Apphia Distant, 1918
 Boundarus Li & Wang, 1998
 Bundera Distant, 1908
 Carinata Li & Wang, 1992
 Concavocorona Wang & Zhang, 2014
 Convexana Li, 1994
  Cunedda Distant, 1918
 Diramus Wang & Zhang, 2013
 Evacanthus Le Peletier & Serville, 1825
  Mainda Distant, 1908
 Mediporus Wang & Zhang, 2015
 Multiformis Li & Li, 2012
 Onukia Matsumura, 1912
 Onukiades Ishihara, 1963
 Onukindia Viraktamath & Webb, 2018
 Paraonukia Ishihara, 1963
 Parapythamus Li & Li, 2011
  Processus Huang, 1992
 Pythamus Melichar, 1903
 Pythochandra Wei & Webb, 2014
 Risefronta Li & Wang, 2001
 Riseveinus Li, 1995
 Shortcrowna Li & Li, 2014
 Simaonukia Li & Li, 2017
 Striatanus Li & Wang, 1995
 Subulatus Yang & Zhang, 2001
 Taperus Li & Wang, 1994
 Tengirhinus Ishihara, 1953
 Transvenosus Wang & Zhang, 2015
 Vangama Distant, 1908

Nirvanini
Erected by Baker in 1923. They are distributed mostly throughout the Southern Hemisphere, but species have spread globally. This tribe previously made up the subfamily Nirvaninae.

 Aequoreus Huang, 1989
 Afrokana Heller, 1972
 Afronirvana Evans, 1955
 Antillonirvana Dietrich, 2004
 Australnirvana Wang, Dietrich & Zhang, 2016
 Buloria Distant, 1908
 Carchariacephalus Montrouzier, 1861
 Chibchanirvana Dietrich, 2004
 Chudania Distant, 1908
 Concaveplana Chen & Li, 1998
 Convexfronta Li, 1997
  Crispina Distant, 1918
 Decursusnirvana Gao, Dai & Zhang, 2014
 Euronirvanella Evans, 1966
 Extensus Huang, 1989
 Jassonirvana Baker, 1923
 Jassosqualus Kramer, 1964
  Kana) Distant, 1908
 Kasunga Linnavuori, 1979
 Kosasia Distant, 1910
 Narecho Jacobi, 1910
 Neonirvana Oman, 1936
  Nirvana Kirkaldy, 1900
 Nirvanoides Baker, 1923
 Oniella Matsumura, 1912
  Ophiuchus Ophiuchus
 Pactana Linnavuori, 1960
 Pythonirvana Baker, 1923
 Sinonirvana Gao, Dai & Zhang, 2014
 Sophonia Walker, F., 1870
 Synogonia Melichar, 1926
 Tahura Melichar, 1926
 Tortor Kirkaldy, 1907

Pagaroniini
Erected by Anufriev in 1978.
 Friscanina Anufriev, 1978
 Pagaroniina Anufriev, 1978
 Epiacanthus Matsumura, 1902
 Friscanus Oman, 1938
 Kurotsuyanus Ishihara, 1953
 Pagaronia Ball, 1902

Pentoffiini 
Erected by Wang, Dietrich & Zhang, 2017.

 Draconirvana Dietrich, 2011
 Pentoffia Kramer, 1964

Incertae sedis
Genera without placement.
 Evanirvana Hill, 1973

References

External links 
 database of observations in the U.S. and Canada

Cicadellidae
Hemiptera subfamilies